Forbes Avenue is one of the longest streets in Pittsburgh, Pennsylvania, United States.

History
According to historical writer and blogger Leon J. Pollom, the lowest section of Forbes Avenue was originally named Diamond Street. The remainder was named Forbes Street in honor of John Forbes (1707–1759), whose expedition recaptured Fort Duquesne and who renamed the place Pittsburgh in 1758. In 1958 during the administration of Mayor David L. Lawrence, Diamond Street and Forbes Street were renamed and combined as Forbes Avenue.

In the past, a portion of what is now Forbes Avenue carried U.S. Routes 22 and 30.

Fern Hollow Bridge collapse

At approximately 6:45 AM EST on January 28, 2022, the Fern Hollow Bridge carrying Forbes Avenue over Fern Hollow Creek in Frick Park collapsed, injuring ten; the bridge was just west of the intersection with Briarcliff Road. Six vehicles were left trapped in the rubble, including a Port Authority articulated bus.

The collapse ruptured a 16 inch (41 cm) natural gas pipeline under the bridge, causing a "massive" leak that was isolated quickly by Peoples Natural Gas.

Route

The buildings that stand along Forbes Avenue are a mixture of old and new. The westernmost terminus of Forbes Avenue lies at Stanwix Street in the downtown part of the city.  This runs eastward past the recent PPG Place, directly through Market Square and then between the 19th century Courthouse and the 20th century City-County Building. Duquesne University, though established in the 19th century, mostly abuts Forbes with some early- to mid-20th century buildings. Some mostly late-19th century buildings form Forbes's passage through Midtown and the Uptown. In Oakland, it goes through a mixture of late 19th century stores, and then passes the University of Pittsburgh's Cathedral of Learning (early 20th century) and the late 19th century Carnegie Library of Pittsburgh.  From Oakland, Forbes Avenue continues eastward past 20th- and 21st- century Carnegie Mellon University and late 19th century Schenley Park, through the small stores of Squirrel Hill, and past Homewood Cemetery and Frick Park before it reaches its eastern terminus at the site of the January 2022 Fern Hollow Bridge collapse.

Photographs

References

Streets in Pittsburgh
Lincoln Highway